Divin may refer to:
Moldovan brandy, see Moldovan_wine#Divin
Divin, Iran, a village in Hamadan Province, Iran